Dhosth is a 2001 Indian Malayalam-language action thriller film directed by Thulasidas. Kunchacko Boban and Dileep share the title role with Kavya Madhavan, Jagathy Sreekumar and Kalabhavan Mani in supporting roles. It is a Malayalam remake of Tamil film Kannedhirey Thondrinal (1998).

Plot
Vijay (Kunchako Boban), a rich guy, meets a girl Geethu (Kavya Madhavan) in the Coimbatore railway station while travelling to Chennai to enroll in an engineering college. It is love at first sight for Vijay. Ajith (Dileep) also studies in the same college where Vijay joins and initially both Vijay and Ajith get off on the wrong foot. Geethu is Ajith's sister and without knowing that Vijay conveys his love to her but Geethu does not appear interested and keeps her distance from him.

One day, Vijay saves Ajith's life from a few thugs. After this, they put their differences aside, and become very close friends. On one occasion, Ajith's mother insults Vijay when he comes over and upset, he leaves. In due course, his mother learns about Vijay's good character and becomes very affectionate towards him. Geethu starts to appreciate him and discovers she loves him too.

Before Vijay and Geethu can announce their love to their families, Ajith informs him about a problem that had occurred in his family a few years ago. Ajith has one more sister (Devika), who he had never mentioned before. She had eloped with his then close friend on the day of her marriage which left Ajith and his mother broken-hearted. They disowned her, and have not spoken to her since. He sees his then-friend's behavior as a traitorous act.

Now Vijay feels bad about his love towards Geethu and decides not to go ahead with the relationship, fearing that Ajith would interpret it as another betrayal. He sacrifices his love for his friendship with Ajith. Geethu however is unwilling to break off the relationship, and requests him to accept her love on many occasions, to no avail. Her family arranges for her wedding, and desperate, she consumes poison and is taken to the hospital. Vijay rushes to hospital along with his friend where all is revealed. Ajith is proud of his friend and agrees to Vijay and Geethu's marriage.

Cast

Production

It was shot in Ernakulam and nearby places. The campus scenes were shot at Christ College, Irinjalakuda.

Soundtrack
Music: Vidyasagar, Lyrics: S. Ramesan Nair.

References

External links
 

2000s Malayalam-language films
Films scored by Vidyasagar
Indian drama films
Indian buddy films
Malayalam remakes of Tamil films
Films directed by Thulasidas
Films shot in Thrissur
Films shot in Chalakudy